The Mind Reader is a 1933 American pre-Code drama film directed by Roy Del Ruth and written by Robert Lord and Wilson Mizner. The film stars Warren William, Constance Cummings, Allen Jenkins, Natalie Moorhead, Mayo Methot and Clarence Muse. The film was released by Warner Bros. on April 1, 1933.

Plot

Cast    
Warren William as Chandra
Constance Cummings as Sylvia
Allen Jenkins as Frank
Natalie Moorhead as Mrs. Austin
Mayo Methot as Jenny
Clarence Muse as Sam
Earle Foxe as Don
George Chandler as Reporter
Wilson Benge as the bearded tooth pulling victim

References

External links
 

1933 films
1933 drama films
American drama films
American black-and-white films
1930s English-language films
Films directed by Roy Del Ruth
First National Pictures films
Warner Bros. films
1930s American films
Films scored by Bernhard Kaun
English-language drama films